The 2017–18 Gozo First Division (known as the BOV GFA First Division for sponsorship reasons) was the 71st season of the Gozo Football League First Division, the highest division in Gozitan football. The season began on 15 September 2017.

Following a dominant campaign, Victoria Hotspurs ended the season as champions, winning their twelfth title in their history.

Format 

The season is composed of a round-robin system where each team plays each other three times, totalling 21 games in total. The seventh-placed team will play a relegation play-off with the second-placed team in the Second Division. Most of the matches are scheduled to be played at the Gozo Stadium, with Sannat Ground and Kerċem Ajax Stadium being used as well.

Teams 

Xagħra United are relegated after they finished last the previous season. They are replaced by Għarb Rangers, who won the 2016–17 Second Division title.

League table

Results

Matches 1–14 

Teams play each other twice, once assigned as home and once away.

Matches 15–22 

Teams play every other team once (either assigned at home or away).

Relegation play-off 

A play-off match took place between the seventh-placed team from the First Division, S.K. Victoria Wanderers, and the second-placed team from the Second Division, Sannat Lions, for a place in the 2018–19 GFA First Division.

Season statistics

Top goalscorers

Awards

Monthly awards

References 

Gozo First Division seasons
Gozo
5